One More Try for Love is the sixteenth studio album by American country music artist Ronnie Milsap, released in 1984. The album produced three singles, including the #1 US Country song "Still Losing You" and "Prisoner of the Highway", which peaked at #6 on the Hot Country Singles chart. "She Loves My Car," which hit #84 on the Billboard Hot 100 and had an accompanying music video featuring actress Mariska Hargitay, was the album's third and final single.

The album reached #10 on Country charts and peaked at #180 on the Billboard 200. Some of tracks were altered electronically including "She Loves My Car" and "Suburbia," which Allmusic described as "tasteful [and] not overdone."

Track listing

Chart performance

Weekly charts

Year-end charts

Singles

References

Roland, Tom. [ One More Try for Love], Allmusic.
Milsap, Ronnie. One More Try for Love, RCA Records.

1984 albums
Ronnie Milsap albums
RCA Records albums